Riccardo Caraglia (born 22 January 1989) is an Italian professional footballer who plays as a midfielder for Serie D club Verbania.

He made his professional debut in the 2008–09 season for Pizzighettone.

External links
 Profile at MagliaRossonera.it 
 Profile at Calciatori. 
 

1989 births
Living people
Italian footballers
Italy youth international footballers
Association football midfielders
A.C. Milan players
A.S. Pizzighettone players
U.S.D. Olginatese players